The Bukh & Gry was a Danish automobile manufactured in 1904.  Its creators, Jens Bukh and John Gry, had both worked in the American automotive industry; together they built only one car, manufactured at Horve and shown at the Tivoli Gardens in Copenhagen in 1905.  This model had a water-cooled 10/12 hp two-cylinder engine and friction drive; no further cars were built.
They continued their business with the construction of diesel engines for tractors and industrial purpose. In 1915 the factory moved from Horve to Kalundborg. Now being close to the Kalundborg shipyard, Bukh produced maritime engines.

References
David Burgess Wise, The New Illustrated Encyclopedia of Automobiles.

Car manufacturers of Denmark
Danish companies established in 1904
Engine manufacturers of Denmark